Mattie the Goose-boy or Lúdas Matyi may refer to:

 Mattie the Goose-boy (poem), Hungarian epic poem by Mihály Fazekas
 Mattie the Goose-boy (1950 film), Hungarian film based on the poem
 Mattie the Goose-boy (1977 film), Hungarian film based on the poem
 Lúdas Matyi (magazine), a Hungarian satirical weekly